Mauricio Correa da Luz (born 7 May 1987), known simply as Mauricio, is a Brazilian footballer who last played for Hong Kong Premier League club Hong Kong Rangers. He is currently a free agent.

Career
Born in Brazil, Mauricio arrived in Hong Kong in 2012 after signing with Tuen Mun. After a couple of seasons, he moved to newly promoted Hong Kong Premier League side Wong Tai Sin.

In July 2015, Mauricio was signed by fellow HKPL club Hong Kong Rangers. On 27 September, he fractured his right toe against Pegasus and was ruled out for a minimum of nine weeks. Mauricio made his return on 18 February 2016 in a friendly against Japanese club FC Ryukyu. On 28 February, after scoring an equalizing goal against Kitchee, Mauricio removed his kit during the celebration. Having already received a yellow card earlier in the match, he was given a second yellow and sent off. Rangers director Philip Lee heavily criticized Mauricio for his behaviour and his contract with the club was terminated shortly after.

On 4 January 2018, Mauricio rejoined Rangers after two and a half years away from the club.

Personal life
Mauricio graduated with a bachelor's degree in Physical Education in December 2017.

References

External links
Mauricio Correa at HKFA

1987 births
Living people
Brazilian footballers
Brazilian expatriate footballers
Brazilian expatriate sportspeople in Hong Kong
Hong Kong Premier League players
Hong Kong Rangers FC players
Tuen Mun SA players
Association football defenders
Footballers from Porto Alegre